Hurricane Harvey was the costliest tropical cyclone on record (tied with Hurricane Katrina of 2005), inflicting roughly $125 billion in damage across the Houston metropolitan area and Southeast Texas. It lasted from mid-August until early September 2017, with many records for rainfall and landfall intensity set during that time. The eighth named storm, third hurricane, and first major hurricane of the 2017 Atlantic hurricane season, Harvey originated from a broad area of low pressure southwest of Cape Verde that was first monitored on August 13. Tracking steadily westward, the disturbance developed strong convection, a well-defined circulation, and sustained tropical storm-force winds, leading to the classification of Tropical Storm Harvey late on August 17. Moderate easterly vertical wind shear kept Harvey weak, as it continued westwards into the Caribbean Sea; despite repeated predictions for gradual intensification by the National Hurricane Center, Harvey eventually opened up into a tropical wave on August 19. The remnants of Harvey continued to move westwards and reached the Yucatán Peninsula on August 22, and were forecast to regenerate into a tropical cyclone after exiting land.

On August 23, Harvey moved into the Bay of Campeche and quickly developed a well-defined circulation, becoming a tropical depression later that day and a tropical storm fifteen hours later. Curving northwestwards into a favorable environment with low wind shear and high sea surface temperatures, Harvey began to consolidate and developed an eye. Rapid intensification ensued as Harvey approached the coast of Texas, with Harvey becoming a hurricane in the afternoon of August 24. Despite some dry air entrainment halting the intensification process for the rest of the day, Harvey soon resumed strengthening and became the season's first major hurricane in the evening of August 25. Continuing to deepen, Harvey attained peak intensity with maximum sustained winds of —Category 4 status on the Saffir–Simpson scale—and a minimum pressure of 937 mbar (hPa; 27.67 inHg), as it made its first landfall near Rockport, Texas at 03:00 UTC on August 26. This made Harvey the first major hurricane to make landfall in the United States since Wilma in 2005, the first major hurricane in Texas since Bret in 1999, and the strongest in Texas since Carla in 1961. Rapid weakening began as Harvey made a second landfall just north of Holiday Beach three hours after its first, degrading to a tropical storm that evening. Trapped between two ridges to its west and east, Harvey dramatically slowed as it moved inland, but began drifting southeast back towards water on August 27.

Harvey reemerged over the extreme western Gulf of Mexico as a weak tropical storm early on August 28; by this time almost  of rain had fallen in the Greater Houston area. Moving slowly east-southeastwards, Harvey would bring an additional  of rain to Greater Houston and parts of southwestern Louisiana over the next three days, becoming the wettest tropical cyclone on record in the United States. Eventually, a trough moving over the Ohio Valley pulled Harvey northwards, and Harvey made a third and final landfall just west of Cameron, Louisiana, on August 30 before weakening into a tropical depression. Continuing to push inland, Harvey gradually lost tropical characteristics and transitioned into an extratropical cyclone on September 1.

Origins and track through the Caribbean

On August 12, a tropical wave moved off the west coast of Africa, accompanied by a large area of convection. The National Hurricane Center (NHC) began to track the wave the next morning, just before the convective mass dissipated. The tropical wave was expected to merge with a broad area of low pressure located southwest of Cape Verde and slowly consolidate, with the NHC giving a low chance of tropical cyclogenesis over the next five days. The merger failed to complete, however, with the two areas of disturbed weather remaining separate despite being contained by the same area of low pressure. The two systems completely split on August 15, with the original low-pressure area continuing westwards towards the Caribbean Sea, while the tropical wave to the east moved farther north. The tropical wave to the east would eventually become Potential Tropical Cyclone Ten off the coast of the Southeastern United States, which failed to develop into a tropical cyclone. Conditions in the Caribbean Sea though were not forecast to be conducive for development. Convection around the low began to increase that same day as a Kelvin wave passed through the area, but remained disorganized amid strong upper-level winds. However, the NHC noted that the low could experience a slight reprieve near the Lesser Antilles. On August 17, satellite imagery revealed that the system had become much more organized, with the circulation becoming better defined.

An Air Force Reserve Hurricane Hunter aircraft investigating the disturbance from 18:00—21:00 UTC on August 17 detected a well-defined circulation center with strong convection sheared to the west. With the system already producing maximum sustained winds near , the disturbance was immediately upgraded to a tropical storm and given the name Harvey. The latter scenario eventually played out as Harvey remained disorganized, with the low- and mid-level circulations becoming misaligned. In fact, a reconnaissance aircraft flying through Harvey on the next day was unable to find a closed mid-level circulation, although the low-level circulation remained intact. By 12:00 UTC on August 19, Harvey had degraded to a tropical depression. The weakening circulation opened up into a wave six hours later. Despite subsiding vertical wind shear ahead, Harvey's quick motion and proximity to dry air were expected to hinder reintensification for the time being. However, the NHC noted the possibility of Harvey regenerating near the Yucatán Peninsula or in the Bay of Campeche.

Regeneration and rapid intensification

On the morning of August 20, the NHC began to feature the remnants of Harvey on their Tropical Weather Outlooks, assessing it with a medium chance of redevelopment over the next five days. However, this was increased to high just hours later after showers and thunderstorms associated with the system increased in coverage. The system regained winds of tropical storm-force later on August 20, yet a closed circulation still could not be found. Harvey's remnant trough continued to move steadily westwards to west-northwestwards towards Belize and the Yucatán Peninsula through August 21, passing over the latter on August 22. As the low-pressure area associated with ex-Harvey moved over land, its circulation became better defined, and the NHC noted that tropical cyclone development was almost a certainty over the next few days as the system entered the Bay of Campeche. At this time, the NHC also mentioned the possibility of hurricane-force winds affecting the coast of Texas.

Over the next few hours, Harvey continued to consolidate, with the radius of maximum winds decreasing to  early on August 24. Moving slowly northwestwards to north-northwestwards in response to a weak ridge to the northeast, Harvey intensified to a tropical storm at 04:00 UTC. Further strengthening was anticipated, as wind shear over Harvey decreased with the weakening of an upper-level low over the northwestern Gulf of Mexico. This resulted in a substantial increase in the intensity forecast, with the cyclone expected to be a powerful hurricane by the time it reached the Texas coastline. Less than two hours later, at 18:00 UTC, Harvey was upgraded to a mid-range Category 1 hurricane on the Saffir–Simpson scale based on additional aircraft data.

Afterwards, the intensification process stalled somewhat and the eye lost some definition, despite a steady decrease in the central pressure. This was attributed to likely dry air entrainment. Early on August 25, however, strengthening resumed again, with Harvey attaining Category 2 intensity at roughly 05:00 UTC that day. During this time, the satellite presentation improved significantly with the appearance of an intermittent eye feature embedded in a central dense overcast (CDO), as well as improving outflow. Rapid strengthening eventually culminated with Harvey reaching peak sustained winds of —a Category 4 hurricane on the Saffir–Simpson scale—at 23:00 UTC, as a well-defined eye formed within the hurricane. The pressure bottomed out at  hours later at 03:00 UTC on August 26, just as it was making landfall on San José Island.

Texas landfalls and subsequent stalling

This made Harvey the first storm to strike the United States at Category 3 intensity or higher since Hurricane Wilma in 2005, the strongest in terms of wind speed to hit the country since Charley in 2004, and the first hurricane to strike Texas since Ike in 2008. Harvey also became the first major hurricane in the state since Bret in 1999, as well as the strongest in Texas since Celia in 1970. The weakening process accelerated as it slowly progressed northwest, with Harvey falling to minimal hurricane strength by 15:00 UTC as the central inner core collapsed and the eye disappeared from visible satellite imagery. Harvey's movement slowed to a crawl as the cyclone became trapped between two ridges to its east and west, which generated light steering currents that prevented any fast movement. Later that day, Harvey weakened to a tropical storm as the central convection continued to warm. As Harvey barely moved and continued dropping rain, catastrophic and record-breaking flooding occurred in the southeastern portion of the Lone Star state. During this time, a total of 52 tornadoes touched down, half of which occurred within or near Greater Houston. The strongest was rated EF2 on the Enhanced Fujita scale, which touched down near Evangeline, Louisiana on the evening of August 29. All of the other tornadoes were ranked at EF0 or EF1 intensity.

By late on August 27, the cyclone completed an anticyclonic loop and began a slow southeastward drift towards the Gulf of Mexico; at this time Harvey was only a minimal tropical storm. Deep convection formed repeatedly in Harvey's right semicircle as it had remained over water, which likely helped the system to sustain tropical-storm-force winds despite being centered over land. Still moving slowly, Harvey emerged back over water into Matagorda Bay late on August 28. Once back over the warm waters of the Gulf of Mexico, deep convection blossomed well to the north of the center of the tropical storm, which led to slight strengthening. Convection blossomed again later that day, with the center jumping northwards into the convection as Harvey began moving to the northeast. As a ridge built over the western Atlantic, Harvey began to be steered north-northeastwards back towards the United States coast.

Rainfall and flooding event

Owing to Harvey's slow motion near and over Texas and Louisiana from 26 to 30 August, prolonged heavy rainfall and resulting widespread record-breaking and catastrophic flooding was observed in many parts of the two states, especially within the Houston metropolitan area. Harvey's combination with a weak stationary front located over the Southern United States resulted in baroclinic enhancement of heavy rains in that region. Warm moist air wrapping round the east side of Harvey's circulation converged with cooler and drier air and rose in a process known as isentropic lifting, creating prolonged heavy rains. As a result, the NHC declared Harvey "the most significant tropical cyclone rainfall event in United States history". This well surpassed the previous records for tropical cyclone rainfall for both the continental United States, which was held by 1978's Tropical Storm Amelia, as well as for the entire United States, which was held by 1950's Hurricane Hiki. The weather station at Houston's George Bush Intercontinental Airport observed all-time record daily rainfall accumulations on both August 26 and 27, measured at  respectively. Elsewhere, Harvey also caused significant flooding in Tennessee where about a foot of rain was recorded.

Final landfall and dissipation
As the storm moved farther inland, weakening commenced once again and Harvey weakened to a tropical depression at 00:00 UTC on August 31. Consequently, the NHC issued its last advisory on the cyclone three hours later, with further information to be handled by the Weather Prediction Center (WPC). While continuing to generate heavy rainfall, Harvey began to lose its tropical characteristics, ultimately transitioning into an extratropical cyclone at 06:00 UTC on September 1 over the Tennessee Valley. Eventually, what was left of Harvey weakened to the point where the WPC terminated advisories on the storm, which it did at 15:00 UTC the next day. The remnants continued moving northeastwards while interacting with a developing low-pressure area over the Mid-Atlantic, dissipating shortly afterwards over northern Kentucky.

See also

 List of Texas hurricanes (1980–present)
 Timeline of the 2017 Atlantic hurricane season
 1932 Freeport hurricane
 Tropical Storm Allison
 Hurricane Florence

References

External links
 
 

Hurricane Harvey
Harvey
Harvey